Doyrantsi is a small hamlet in Ardino Municipality, Kardzhali Province, southern-central Bulgaria. It covers an area of 10.426 square kilometres and as of 2007 had a population of 2 people.

References

Villages in Kardzhali Province